Ziemer is a surname. Notable people with the surname include:

Arthur C. Ziemer (1848–1913), American Christian Science healer
Andrew Ziemer (born 1967), American soccer player
Ernst Ziemer (1911–1986), German soldier
Gregor Ziemer (1899–1982), American educator
James L. Ziemer (born 1951), American businessman
Marcel Ziemer (born 1985), German footballer
R. Timothy Ziemer, American expert in disaster response and health threats